The Creux du Van is a natural rocky cirque approximately 1,400 metres wide and 150 metres deep, on the north side of Le Soliat, in the Val de Travers district in the Swiss canton of Neuchâtel. A very well known, amphitheatre-shaped natural attraction, it is at the heart of a nature reservation area of 15.5 km2.

Geology
The rocky arc of Creux du Van was created in three phases:

Phase 1: A glacier covered the area of today's Val de Travers around 140,000 years ago (Würm Ice Age). The stream of meltwater eroded material, making a V-shaped valley.

Phase 2: During subsequent ice ages, other glaciers were created and hollowed out the valley. In warmer periods, the material was eroded by meltwater.

Phase 3: After the removal of rocks from the fault, erosion of a stronger layer from a different age was much slower.

See cirque for a description of the process forming features like this.

The ground beneath the Creux du Van remains permanently frozen to this day (permafrost).

Attraction
Ibex were introduced in the area in 1965. , there are 17.

Access 
The summit area can be reached on foot or by car. Some hiking paths are signposted, via .

Notable trails in the areas include:
 (the path of the 14 bends) starts in Noiraigue (Val-de-Travers).
 leads to the summit directly from the area called .
 Other unmarked paths allow access to the summit via  or also from  via  (a breach into the wall of rocks).

Panorama 

1467 Montagne de Bounty

References
 Creux du Van (Canton of Neuchâtel Tourist Office)

Notes

Tourist attractions in Switzerland
Mountains of the canton of Neuchâtel
Cirques of Europe
Mountains of Switzerland